The 2021 Monmouth Hawks football team represented the Monmouth University during the 2021 NCAA Division I FCS football season. The Hawks played their home games at the Kessler Stadium in West Long Branch, New Jersey. The team was coached by twenty-ninth-year head coach Kevin Callahan.

This was Monmouth's final season as a member of the Big South Conference. The Hawks will be joining the Colonial Athletic Association (CAA) for all sports starting in 2022–23.

Schedule
Monmouth announced its 2021 football schedule on May 27, 2021. The 2021 schedule consisted of 5 home and 6 away games in the regular season.

References

Monmouth Hawks
Monmouth Hawks football seasons
Monmouth Hawks football